Group C of the EuroBasket Women 2019 took place between 27 and 30 June 2019. The group consisted of Hungary, Italy, Slovenia and Turkey and played all of its games at Niš, Serbia.

Standings

All times are local (UTC+2).

Matches

Hungary vs Slovenia

Turkey vs Italy

Slovenia vs Turkey

Italy vs Hungary

Hungary vs Turkey

Italy vs Slovenia

References

External links
Official website

Group C
2018–19 in Hungarian basketball
2018–19 in Turkish basketball
2018–19 in Italian basketball
2018–19 in Slovenian basketball
Sport in Niš